Subtrade: Return to Irata is a multiplayer video game developed in 1993 by the German developer Century Interactive. It is a clone of the popular Atari 8-bit family game M.U.L.E. designed by Dan Bunten and published by Electronic Arts in 1983. Subtrade was originally written for the Amiga, and later ported to MS-DOS.

Gameplay
Like M.U.L.E., the game is about four colonists (players) building up an economy on the planet Irata (Atari spelled backwards). The objective is to become the richest colonist within twelve game turns, while also attempting to improve the overall health of the colony.

In contrast to M.U.L.E., the setting is transferred to a sub-oceanic world. The most notable change in game play is the addition of a fifth choice of how to outfit the labour element. The new type allows the player to build his own labour elements (M.U.L.E.s, or in this case, turtles), so that the player won't have to buy them from the store.

See also
 M.U.L.E.
 Traders (video game)
 Planet M.U.L.E.

References

External links
Comparison of M.U.L.E. with Subtrade
The Legacy Museum

1993 video games
Amiga games
DOS games
Multiplayer and single-player video games
Reakktor Studios games
Turn-based strategy video games
Video game clones
Video games developed in Germany